Terrence E. McNally (born May 29, 1948) is an American actor and radio host. He has appeared in such films and television shows as Star Trek: The Next Generation, Dallas, Nine to Five, Taking Care of Business, Looker and Battle Beyond the Stars.

McNally produced the film Earth Girls Are Easy, which he co-wrote with and featured his then-wife, actress/singer Julie Brown. He also worked with her on a number of her early recordings.

For more than 15 years, McNally has hosted Free Forum on Pacifica Radio stations KPFK and WBAI.  In 2013 he also hosted Cinema Interruptus at the Conference on World Affairs.

Filmography

References

External links
 
 
 

American radio personalities
American male film actors
American male screenwriters
Place of birth missing (living people)
Living people
1948 births